Girinagar (formerly known as Writer's Colony) is a residential area in South West Bengaluru, very close to Mysore Road. This medium-sized locality is surrounded by Nayandahalli in the west, Byatarayanapura and Deepanjali Nagar in the north, Srinagar and Banashankari in the east and Hosakerehalli in the south.

Etymology 
Girinagar was named after the former President of India V. V. Giri and also because of the Hirannayya Gudda (Hill). Giri in Sanskrit means hill.

Geography
Girinagar is at a lower altitude (865 m) compared to the rest of Bengaluru, which has an average elevation of 900 m. It is very hilly, with steep roads – being on the slope of a hill with a plateau on top. To the west of Girinagar is a hill, known as Hirannayya Gudda in Kannada. Girinagar lies in the Vrishabhavathi Valley region of Bengaluru.

Girinagar is divided into 4 phases, with the 2nd phase being the largest. It also subsumes areas such as T Block, Muneshwara Block, Nagendra Block, Avalahalli, Ganapathi Nagar and Chamundi Nagar.

Culture
Girinagar is one of the older areas of Bengaluru, with a predominantly Kannada speaking population. The population is also predominantly Hindu. 

Being in Southwest Bengaluru, Girinagar is well connected to the central Bengaluru. However, with several major employers opening offices in South Bengaluru, and with a series of new malls and multiplexes coming up in its vicinity, Girinagar has maintained its desirability for the upwardly-mobile, family-oriented audience. In other words, it retains the culture and traditions of Bengaluru being solely occupied by families living in the city for more than a century.

Educationcal institutions

There are many schools including Vijayabharthi Vidyalaya, Auden Public School, Shantiniketan and St. Muller Public School, St Michel's English School. Pre University Colleges include Vijaya Bharati PU College and Narayana PU College. Girinagar is also close to several engineering Colleges Rashtriya Vidyalaya College of Engineering, PES Institute of Technology, RNSIT, and BMSCE. Girinagar has Aksharam, a well known Sanskrit Institution, right next to the Raghavendra Mutt.

Administration

Girinagar lies in the Bengaluru South parliamentary constituency. The incumbent Member of Parliament of Bengaluru South is Shri. Tejasvi surya (BJP). Most of Girinagar lies in the Basavanagudi assembly constituency. The incumbent Member of Legislative assembly is Shri. Ravi Subramanya (BJP), who resides in Girinagar. However the part of Girinagar north of 50 Feet Road viz. Avalahalli, 3rd Phase, Muneshwara Block and Ganapathi Nagar sub localities lies in the Vijayanagar assembly constituency. The current sitting Member of Legislative assembly is Shri. M. Krishnappa (INC).

Girinagar is also a ward in the Bengaluru South zone of the BBMP (ward no. 162). It ranges from Nagendra Block in the east to Hosakerehalli Road in the west, from 50 Feet Road in the north to ORR in the south. and spans 1.77 km2. The ward has been reserved for women and the current corporator is Smt. H.S. Lalitha (BJP). However the northernmost part of Girinagar (north of 50 Feet road) lies in the Deepanjali Nagar ward (ward no. 158), also in the Bengaluru South Zone and spans 2.09 km2. This ward is also reserved for women and the current corporator is Smt. Malathi (BJP).

Transportation

Girinagar is one of the better-known areas of Bengaluru and most modes of transport in Bengaluru will get you in and out of Girinagar, including public buses, autorickshaws and taxicabs.

The main roads of Girinagar are a) 50 Feet Road (connecting the ORR to Basavanagudi), b) 80 Feet Road (connecting Hosakerehalli Road to Nagendra Block), c) Nehru Road (connecting 50 Feet Road to Girinagar 2nd phase) and d) Hosakerehalli Road (connecting Mysore Road to the ORR). Arterial roads like Mysore Road and the ORR are just 1 km from Girinagar.

Girinagar is well connected by BMTC buses from Majestic and Shivajinagar. The buses are not very frequent but regular. The routes from Majestic are 10 (Marcopolo AC route), 36A, 36B, 36E, and 36G which can be boarded from platform 10 in Majestic. The routes from Shivajinagar are 37E and 37F, which can be boarded from platform 10 in Shivajinagar.

References

Neighbourhoods in Bangalore